Catherine Jane Caro  (born 24 June 1957) is a feminist social commentator, writer and lecturer based in Australia.

Early life and education
Caro was born in London in 1957 and emigrated to Australia with her parents as a five-year-old in 1963. She attended Macquarie University, where she graduated with a Bachelor of Arts with a major in English literature in 1977.

Working life
Caro started her career in marketing, however soon moved into advertising.

Caro has appeared on Channel Seven's Sunrise, ABC television's Q&A and as a regular panellist on The Gruen Transfer.  Caro has worked in the advertising industry and lectures in advertising at the School of Humanities and Communication Arts at University of Western Sydney. Caro was a speaker at the 2014 Festival of Dangerous Ideas.

She is on the boards of the NSW Public Education Foundation and Bell Shakespeare, and is an ambassador for the National Secular Lobby.

In Australia, Caro is represented by Wall Media management.

A proponent of public education, Caro is also a feminist and atheist. Caro had been tipped to run against Tony Abbott in the 2019 Australian federal election, for his long-held Sydney seat in the Australian House of Representatives, the Division of Warringah, but instead publicly advocated voting for the Australian Greens, Sarah Hanson-Young specifically.

In 2018, Caro won the Women in Leadership Award in the 2018 Walkley Awards. She was appointed a Member of the Order of Australia (AM) in the 2019 Queen's Birthday Honours in recognition of her "significant service to the broadcast media as a journalist, social commentator and author".

Caro stood as a Reason Party candidate for a New South Wales Australian Senate seat in the 2022 Australian federal election.

Publications
 The Stupid Country: How Australia is Dismantling Public Education (co-authored with Chris Bonnor) (2007), 
 The F Word. How we learned to swear by feminism (co-authored with Catherine Fox) (2008), 
 Just a Girl (2011), 
 Chris Bonner & Jane Caro, What makes a good school?, New South Books (2012), 
 Contributor to For God's sake: An Atheist, A Jew, A Christian and a Muslim debate religion (2013), 
 Editor of Destroying the Joint: Why women have to change the world (2013), 
 Just a Queen (2015), sequel to Just a Girl, 
 Plain-speaking Jane, biography and memoirs (2015), 
 "Unbreakable" Women Share Stories of Resilience and Hope (2017), 
 Just Flesh and Blood (2018), 
 Accidental Feminists (2019), 
 The Mother (2022),

References

External links
 Official website
 Jane Caro on The Conversation
 Caro's articles on The Guardian
 Caro's articles on Online Opinion.
 Caro's articles in The Sydney Morning Herald
 Jane Caro on The ABC

1957 births
20th-century atheists
20th-century Australian women writers
20th-century Australian writers
21st-century atheists
21st-century Australian novelists
21st-century Australian women writers
Atheist feminists
Australian activists
Australian atheists
Australian feminist writers
Australian non-fiction writers
Australian women non-fiction writers
Australian women novelists
Living people
Macquarie University alumni
Members of the Order of Australia
Australian social commentators
Academic staff of Western Sydney University